Lakeland Christian School (LCS) is a private Christian school located in Lakeland, Florida. Bible classes are mandatory and they have a weekly chapel. K4-12th grade school grades.

History 
Established in 1954, Lakeland Christian is Polk County's oldest and largest private school. The school was started by Evelyn Wheeler and a small group of families in Lakeland. Together they felt there was a need for Christian education in the area so on July 21, 1954 they founded Lakeland Christian Grammar School. It began with 19 students and 2 teachers in a Collection of Sunday school classrooms.

In 1955, a house on 735 Chiles Street was purchased. School was held here until 1962 when the current property on 1111 Forest Park street was bought for $10,000. From 1970-1973 two classroom wings, a kindergarten building, and 6 more classrooms were added, as well as a groundbreaking for a new gymnasium.

The current headmaster is Dr. Mike Sligh. The current secondary principal is Keith Overholt.

Known as the "Vikings", their rivals are the Santa Fe Catholic High School Hawks, the Fort Meade High School Miners, the Berkeley Preparatory School Buccaneers, and the All Saints Academy Saints.

References

External links 
 Lakeland Christian School Official Site

Christian schools in Florida
Private high schools in Florida
Private middle schools in Florida
Private elementary schools in Florida
Schools in Lakeland, Florida